The Charlottesville Metropolitan Statistical Area is a Metropolitan Statistical Area (MSA) in the Piedmont region of the Commonwealth of Virginia as defined by the Office of Management and Budget (OMB).
The combined population is: 201,559 (2010 census), 218,615 (2018 estimate) & 235,232 (2019 estimate)

MSA components
Note: Since a constitutional change in 1871, all cities in the state are independent cities. The OMB considers these independent cities to be county-equivalents for the purpose of defining MSAs in Virginia.

There are five counties and one independent city that contribute to the Charlottesville Metropolitan Statistical Area.

Counties
Albemarle
Buckingham
Fluvanna
Greene
Nelson
Independent Cities
Charlottesville

Communities

Places with more than 40,000 inhabitants
Charlottesville (Principal city)

Places with 1,000 to 10,000 inhabitants
Crozet (census-designated place)
Hollymead (census-designated place)
Lake Monticello (census-designated place)

Places with less than 1,000 inhabitants
Columbia (incorporated town in Fluvanna County)
Scottsville (incorporated town in Albemarle County)
Stanardsville (incorporated town in Greene County)

Unincorporated places

Demographics
As of the census of 2000, there were 174,021 people, 67,575 households, and 42,840 families residing within the MSA. The racial makeup of the MSA was 80.77% White, 14.07% African American, 0.16% Native American, 2.68% Asian, 0.03% Pacific Islander, 0.80% from other races, and 1.50% from two or more races. Hispanic or Latino of any race were 2.23% of the population.

The median income for a household in the MSA was $42,166, and the median income for a family was $50,225. Males had a median income of $32,974 versus $26,579 for females. The per capita income for the MSA was $21,574.

Politics 

The Charlottesville metropolitan area leans Democratic. Similar to other college towns, Charlottesville is a Democratic stronghold. Albemarle leans Democratic, paralleling the entire region, since it houses urban, suburban, exurban, and rural pockets. Greene is a Republican stronghold as it is composed of suburban, exurban, and rural areas, which vote more conservative than their urban counterparts. Although Buckingham and Nelson are almost entirely rural, they are the most moderate jurisdictions in the region, voting for the Democratic nominee Barack Obama in the 2008 and 2012 presidential elections and the Republican nominee Donald Trump in the 2016 presidential election, respectively.

The entire region, apart from Greene County, is located in Virginia's 5th congressional district, represented by Republican Bob Good. The district has a Cook PVI of R+7.

See also
List of U.S. Metropolitan Statistical Areas in Virginia
Virginia census statistical areas

References

 
Albemarle County, Virginia
Fluvanna County, Virginia
Greene County, Virginia
Nelson County, Virginia

Western Virginia